Parliamentary elections were held in Latvia on 6 and 7 October 1928. The Latvian Social Democratic Workers' Party remained the largest party, winning 25 of the 100 seats.

Electoral system
For the elections the country was divided into five constituencies, electing a total of 100 MPs using proportional representation (an increase from 97), with the three seats that had previously been awarded to the parties with the highest vote totals that had failed to win a seat in any of the five constituencies were scrapped.

The list system used was made flexible, as voters were able to cross out candidates' names and replace them with names from other lists, a system 32% of voters took advantage of. Whilst previously parties needed only collect 100 signatures to register for an election, the system was changed for this election, with a deposit of 1,000 lats introduced, which was only refunded if parties won a seat. Combined with the scrapping of the three compensatory seats, this had the effect of reducing the number of registering parties, which fell from 141 to 120. Of the 120, only 66 contested the election.

Results

References

Latvia
Parliamentary
Parliamentary elections in Latvia